The Hunters of the Alps were a military corps created by Giuseppe Garibaldi in Cuneo on 20 February 1859 to help the regular Sardinian army to free the northern part of Italy in the Second  Italian War of Independence.

As their name suggests, the corps' five regiments of volunteers operated in the Alps. Among their victories in the Second Italian War of Independence in 1859, were those over the Austrians at Varese and Como.

They also saw action during the Third Italian War of Independence in 1866, fighting on the Prussian side against the Austrians. On this occasion, the 40,000 volunteers showed their value by achieving a decisive victory at the Battle of Bezzecca (21 July 1866), and thus nearly reaching the town of Trento. 

The 22nd Infantry Division "Cacciatori delle Alpi" of World War II was named after Hunters of the Alps unit.

See also
Invasion of Trentino (1866)
Alpini
Cacciatori d'Africa

References
A History of the Nations and Empires Involved and a Study of the Events Culminating in the Great Conflict, by Logan Marshall, Project Gutenberg Etext - Chapter IX. "Garibaldi and Italian Unity"

Footnotes

Military units and formations of the Wars of Italian Independence
Military units and formations of Italy
Military units and formations established in 1859
Military units and formations disestablished in 1866
1859 establishments in Italy
Giuseppe Garibaldi
1866 disestablishments in Italy